Hungry Hollow may refer to:

Georgetown, Ontario, Canada
Arkona, Ontario, Canada
Granite City, Illinois, US
Garrett County, Maryland, US
Phillips County, Kansas, US
Klamath County, Oregon, US

Other uses
Hungry Hollow: The Story of a Natural Place, a novel by Alexander Dewdney